The Paris Saint-Germain Training Center, sometimes referred to as Campus PSG, located in Poissy, Paris Region, will be the new training ground and sports complex of Paris Saint-Germain Football Club. It will replace Camp des Loges — the club's current training facility in nearby Saint-Germain-en-Laye — upon its completion in 2023.

Owned and financed by the club, the venue will bring together PSG's male football, handball and judo teams, as well as the football and handball academies. Each division will have its own dedicated facilities. PSG, however, will remain closely linked to its historic birthplace in Saint-Germain-en-Laye as Camp des Loges will become the training ground of the female football team and academy.

The Campus PSG will have its own stadium, which will complement Parc des Princes. With a total capacity of 5,000, including over 3,000 seats, the arena will be the largest football stadium in the Yvelines department. It will host matches for PSG's youth and female sides in official competitions such as the UEFA Youth League and the UEFA Women's Champions League.

25 minutes away from Parc des Princes and 15 minutes from Camp des Loges, the 74-hectare site is part of PSG's global strategy to become one of the best-performing multi-sport clubs in the world. Construction began in February 2020 and is expected to end in June 2023. The capital club will invest €350m. PSG entrusted the project to French architect Jean-Michel Wilmotte and his architectural firm Wilmotte & Associés, known for designing the Allianz Riviera and the Kaliningrad Stadium.

Development

The Parisian club began scouting locations for its new training ground in 2012. PSG's Qatari owners, led by club president Nasser Al-Khelaifi, deemed Camp des Loges and its limited space available as below the club's ambitions. Poissy, Saint-Germain-en-Laye and Thiverval-Grignon were considered for the future training camp. In 2016, the club selected the Poncy site in Poissy, a commune in the Yvelines department in the western suburbs of Paris Region. PSG will invest €350m between land acquisition and construction costs.

In July 2019, the Poissy City Council, the Urban Community of Grand Paris Seine & Oise and Les Yvelines Departmental Council granted environmental approval and issued building permits for the centre and the stadium. The project officially broke ground on February 29, 2020. Instead of laying a stone, the Mayor of Poissy, Karl Olive, and the deputy general manager of PSG, Jean-Claude Blanc, launched the construction by planting the first of the 3,000 trees that will live in the club's environmentally friendly centre. Initially scheduled before the start of the 2022–23 Ligue 1 season, the opening is now expected to take place in June 2023 ahead of the 2023–24 campaign. The project will create more than 1,000 jobs.

Located in a hilly area just outside Paris, at the heart of a natural landscaped setting, preserving this identity was one of the key points of the architectural project undertaken by the Wilmotte & Associés agency. Accordingly, Jean-Michel Wilmotte conceived the project as a park, where buildings coexist and blend with nature. The Paris Saint-Germain Training Center — the first ever 100% PSG infrastructure — will house 180 professional athletes and youngsters year-round, as well as employ a staff of around 100 people in six main facilities: Club House, First Team, Academy, Handball and Judo, Stadium, and Rouge & Blue School.

Facilities

Club House

The Paris Saint-Germain Training Center will bring together – for the first time, and in the same location – the club's male professional football, handball and judo teams, as well as the academies for football and handball; and the Club House will be the central meeting point of the entire PSG family, gathering players, staff and invited teams. Preceded by a walkway and situated in the middle of the first two plateaux, the Club House will also work as the entrance to the multi-sport complex.

The Club House is cube-shaped and entirely glassed at ground-floor level to provide views out into the surrounding landscape. Inside, a shape entitled “The Blue Flight” rises skywards, symbolising the ultimate goal of all of the club's athletes according to chief architect Jean-Michel Wilmotte. The interiors of the Club House will also feature a dining area, a library/bookshop, a lecture hall with a capacity of 150 spectators, and offices.

First Team

Surrounded by greenery, the professional footballers' building is located on the highest level of the site, with its rooftop terrace providing a 360° view of the Paris Saint-Germain Training Center. According to the architect, this positioning is meant to symbolise for young academy players training on the lower plateau where they are now and where they want to be in the future.

The professionals' plateau will feature three connected training pitches, a training area for goalkeepers and a covered stand with a capacity of approximately 500 spectators. Inside, the area exclusively reserved for professional players and staff will also include changing rooms, a communal living room, a performance area with high-tech fitness rooms, a video analysis room, therapeutic pools, a medical treatment room, a dining area, and 46 individual bedrooms for players to rest the night before matches or recover after training. In total, the campus will boast 10,000 m2 set aside for professionals.

Academy

Designed to accommodate its 140 academy players, aged between 13 and 19, the club has set aside nearly 13,000 m2 of space and facilities. There, the Paris Saint-Germain Training Center will offer talented young footballers, aged between 13 and 19, first-rate educational and sporting support.

The academy plateau will feature three main buildings for training, education and accommodation:
 the first will focus on the sporting side (fitness rooms and recovery areas, a medical treatment room, administrative offices and meeting rooms);
 the second is where the players will be educated (classrooms, a computer room, a laboratory, a documentation and information centre, a staff room, living areas, nursing station, etc.). As for the younger academy players, they will be able to receive class in the schools in neighbouring towns;
 the third building will have 120 bedrooms, where the players will live in.

There will also be nine football pitches made available to the academy and the Rouge & Bleu School, one of which will be covered and enclosed. This facility, one of the first of its kind in Europe, will allow training sessions to be held irrespective of the weather. The youngsters will also have access to five-a-side pitches and football tennis pitches.

Handball and Judo

On the second plateau of the Paris Saint-Germain Training Center, handball players – professionals as well as academy attendees – and judokas will have their own specific areas and facilities spread over 4,510 m2 of space:
 the handball division will enjoy the use of two fields, a stand with a capacity of 250 spectators, fitness rooms, recovery areas, staff offices and meeting rooms;
 the judo facilities will comprise two dojos, a physical training room and a physiotherapy room.

Stadium

Located at the front of the site and boasting a capacity of 5,000 spectators, including 3,000 seats, the Paris Saint-Germain Training Center Stadium will be the largest football arena in the Yvelines department. Despite being the new residents of Camp des Loges, the women's team will still play some of their Division 1 Féminine and UEFA Women's Champions League games at the stadium. It will also host matches for PSG's youngsters in the UEFA Youth League and other official competitions.

A space accessible to the general public is planned for the vicinity of the stadium. With up to 5,000 m2 of potential retail space, it may eventually house a PSG club shop, restaurants and an exhibition area. The stadium's dynamic architecture is composed of slender, horizontal, semi-filtering arcs; and its powerful floodlights lit up on match nights will illuminate the entire site.

Rouge & Blue School

The areas and amenities within the Campus PSG will allow to expand the actions of the Paris Saint-Germain Foundation, including the opening of its third Rouge & Bleu School, after those in Paris and Mantes-la-Jolie. Placed under the patronage of the French National Commission for UNESCO, this after-school programme, run and developed by the foundation, will help underprivileged children aged 7 to 11 in Poissy through education and sport.

During the school holidays, another initiative run by the foundation called “PSG Holidays” will see children who are not going away on holiday to spend a week with the club, taking part in sport-related workshops and cultural visits in the region. The facilities of the training center will also enable the arrival and supervision of young patients as part of the partnership between the foundation and the Necker Hospital for Sick Children. This partnership, implemented in 2012, enables sick youngsters to attend training sessions and meet their favourite players.

The PSG Foundation aims to support disadvantaged or sick children, as well as young people and communities in difficulty. Founded in 2000 by the club, the foundation develops educational and sports programmes in France and abroad, which use sport and its values, as a lever for learning, self-development and solidarity. The Rouge & Blue Schools are one of these programmes. Other activities include social and professional inclusion programmes, support for refugees and donations to charities. In 19 years, more than 220,000 children and teenagers have benefited from the programmes of the foundation.

See also

 Parc des Princes
 Camp des Loges
 Stade Municipal Georges Lefèvre

References

External links

Official websites
PSG.FR - Site officiel du Paris Saint-Germain
Paris Saint-Germain - Ligue 1
Paris Saint-Germain - UEFA.com

Paris Saint-Germain Training Center
Paris Saint-Germain Training Center
Sports venues in Yvelines